The 2020 presidential and parliamentary election was held in the Autonomous Region of Bougainville between 12 August and 1 September 2020. 440 candidates were contesting the 40 seats in the Bougainville House of Representatives, including 25 competing to be President of the Autonomous Region of Bougainville. The new government will negotiate the outcome of the 2019 Bougainvillean independence referendum, which saw 98.3% of voters supporting independence from Papua New Guinea.

Originally scheduled to be held in May, the elections were delayed twice due to the COVID-19 pandemic, first until June, and then again until August.

On 21 August 2020 the Electoral Commissioner announced that polling had almost been completed, one week ahead of schedule. On 24 August a police officer was suspended for allegedly interfering with the election. Several other officers are under investigation.

Presidential election
Elections are held under the instant-runoff voting system, with voters classifying exactly three candidates. 25 candidates are contesting the presidency, including former President James Tanis, former soldier Thomas Raivet, MP Fidelis Semoso, lawyer Paul Nerau, businessman Peter Tsiamalili, health care professional Ruby Mirinka, and former MP Magdalene Toroansi.

Incumbent President John Momis attempted to change the constitution to allow him to stand for a third term. Following Parliament voting down the amendment he unsuccessfully challenged the decision in the Papua New Guinea Supreme Court.

Results
Vote counting began on 4 September 2020. Partial results at the beginning of the elimination process on 18 September had former Bougainville Revolutionary Army commander Ishmael Toroama leading, with 
former PNG MP Father Simon Dumarinu in second place, followed by Thomas Raivet and Fidelis Semoso.

On 14 September the counting period was extended until 24 September due to the number of votes and candidates.

On 23 September Ishmael Toroama was declared the winner after the 23rd elimination, with 48,766 votes. Father Simon Dumarinu came second with 30,688. Toroama's caretaker government was formally sworn in on 25 September. His Cabinet was announced on 2 October 2020.

References

External links
 Office of the Bougainville Electoral Commissioner

2020 elections in Oceania
General election
August 2020 events in Oceania
2020
September 2020 events in Oceania